Attena may refer to:

 Lütet Attena (died c.1410), East Frisian chieftain of Norderland
 Sibet Attena (c.1425–1473), East Frisian chieftain of Esens

See also
 Antenna (disambiguation)